The Rev Robert Henry Whitcombe (18 July 1862–19 March 1922) was an eminent Anglican Bishop. Educated at Winchester and New College, Oxford, from 1886 to 1899 he was a schoolmaster at Wellington College and then Eton.  After this he was Rector of Hardwick, Buckinghamshire and then Vicar of Romford before a 13-year spell as Bishop of Colchester from 1909. A memorial window and plaque to him is situated on the south wall of St Mary-at-the-Walls, Colchester.

Notes

 

1862 births
People from Gravesend, Kent
People educated at Winchester College
Bishops of Colchester
1922 deaths
Alumni of New College, Oxford
20th-century Church of England bishops